Neal House may refer to:

Noel Owen Neal House, Nashville, Arkansas, listed on the NRHP in Howard County, Arkansas
W. Scott Neal House, Boise, Idaho, listed on the NRHP in Ada County, Idaho
Halbert F. and Grace Neal House, Meridian, Idaho, listed on the NRHP in Ada County, Idaho
Jairus Neal House, Newton, Kansas, listed on the NRHP in Harvey County, Kansas
Neal-Hamblen House, Chestnut Grove, Kentucky, listed on the NRHP in Shelby County, Kentucky
Neal House (Milton, Kentucky), listed on the National Register of Historic Places in Trimble County, Kentucky
Priest Neal's Mass House and Mill Site, Bel Air, Maryland, listed on the NRHP in Harford County, Maryland
James Neal House, Portsmouth, New Hampshire, listed on the NRHP in Rockingham County, New Hampshire 
Neal House (Ennis, Texas), listed on the National Register of Historic Places in Ellis County, Texas

See also
Neale House (disambiguation)
O'Neal House (disambiguation)